Harinagar may refer to:
Harinagar, Bihar (Located in Sunsari, Nepal)
Harinagar, Mayabunder, Andaman Islands
Harinagar Poonkunnam, Kerala
Harinagar, Uttar Pradesh